Indore Municipal Corporation is the governing body of the city of Indore in the Indian state of Madhya Pradesh. The municipal corporation consists of democratically elected members, is headed by a mayor and administers the city's infrastructure and public services. Members from the state's leading various political parties hold elected offices in the corporation. It is the richest Municipal corporation in terms of revenue generated in the state of Madhya Pradesh.

History

Due to lacked planned development in regards to facilities like water supply, drainage, sanitation and waste disposal, the first municipality was constituted in Indore in 1870 and Bakshi Khajan Singh was appointed the chairman.

In 1906, Indore municipality started its own powerhouse and established a new water supply system from the Bilaoli water body. Then in 1912, municipality became the first city in India to have an elected municipal government responsible for the growth and welfare of the city.

After independence, Indore city was included into Madhya Bharat and declared as the first category of municipality by the local government department of Madhya Bharat. In the year 1956, during the re-organisation of states, Indore was included in Madhya Pradesh and in the same year it was declared a Municipal Corporation.

Governance

At present, the municipal area is divided into 19 zones and 85 wards of various sizes and population. As per the provision of Madhya Pradesh Municipal Corporation Act, 1956, IMC has a chairman (Mayor), councilors elected by direct election from 85 wards, 1 member of Parliament, 5 members of State Legislative Assembly representing constituencies within municipal areas. In accordance with the 74th constitutional amendment 25 seats out of 69 are reserved for women.

Pushyamitra Bhargav is the mayor elected in 2022.

Jurisdiction

The IMC area is bounded by the junction of MR-10 and Bypass Road towards east along the Eastern Ring Road, the Kanadia Road up to its junction with the Bypass Road; thence towards northeast along the AB Road and Eastern Ring Road up to the MR-11; thence towards south along the Khandwa Road; thence towards south along the railway line up to its junction with the Sukhniwas Road; up to its junction with AB Road, thence towards south along the AB Road; up to its junction with the last road leading to Rajendra Nagar; thence towards west along the Ahmedabad Road up to Sinhasa; thence towards west along the Airport Road up to Devi Ahilyabai Holkar Airport at its junction with MR-10 (Super Corridor); thence towards northwest along the Depalpur Road up to its junction with the MR-10; thence towards north along the MR-10  up to its junction with Ujjain Road (MDR-27).

Departments

IMC has 13 departments:-

Accounts Department
Education Department
Electrical and Mechanical Department
Fire Department
Food and Civil Supplies Department
Health Department
Housing & Environmental Department
Information Technology Department
Law and General Administration Department
Planning & Rehabilitation Department
Public Work Department	
Revenue Department
Water Work and Drainage Department

Smart City Indore

Smart City Indore is an initiative of the corporation to engage citizens of Indore in the process to qualify the city of Indore in the first round of Smart City Mission launched by Government of India. The project is currently into its second stage.

Smart City Indore is an initiative launched by Indore Municipal Corporation, which includes the participation of residents to qualify Indore to the Smart City Mission launched by the Government of India in first round  by taking suggestions and feedback from the residents. Indore is shortlisted by the Ministry of Urban Development as one of the 100 cities under Smart City Mission. The project aims to
emphasize development in various sectors including Governance, Transportation, Energy & Waste Management, Water Management, Finance, Health & Education, Infrastructure and Heritage. The website and logo of the Smart City Indore program was launched by city mayor Malini Gaur on 3 October 2015.

On 13 November 2015, the British Prime Minister David Cameron announced that British firms will also be helping and funding the project in order to make Indore (along with Pune and Amravati)  a smart city.

Indore successfully qualified in Phase-1 of the Smart Cities Mission, it ranked eleventh on the list released by Union Minister Venkaiah Naidu (MoUD) and is one of the first twenty cities to be developed as Smart City. The Smart City Indore mission was widely appreciated for the efforts put by the government in citizen engagement.

According to the latest report created by a team of master students and alumni of urban planning at the Ahmedabad-based Center for Environmental Planning and Technology (CEPT) University, Indore is among the Top Scorers. The cities have been ranked based on the extent to which they have communicated and taken public feedback on their plans through basic online platforms : the urban local body websites, Facebook page and the Union government portal mygov.in.

Revenue sources 

The following are the Income sources for the Corporation from the Central and State Government.

Revenue from taxes  
Following is the Tax related revenue for the corporation.

 Property tax.
 Profession tax.
 Entertainment tax.
 Grants from Central and State Government like Goods and Services Tax.
 Advertisement tax.

Revenue from non-tax sources 

Following is the Non Tax related revenue for the corporation.

 Water usage charges.
 Fees from Documentation services.
 Rent received from municipal property.
 Funds from municipal bonds.
 Carbon-credit trading.

References

Municipal corporations in Madhya Pradesh
Government of Indore
1870 establishments in India